Xyelodontophis is a genus of snake in the family Colubridae  that contains the sole species Xyelodontophis uluguruensis. It is commonly known as the dagger-tooth vine snake.

It is found in Tanzania.

References 

Colubrids
Monotypic snake genera
Reptiles described in 2002
Reptiles of Tanzania